Solomon Lew (born 22 March 1945) is an Australian businessman. His principal commercial activities involve importing apparel, toys and other goods into Australia from China and investments, mainly in retail companies.

As a teenager, Lew supplied dresses to the Myer Emporium in Melbourne using his company Voyager Solo. In 2014 Lew built a ten per cent stake in David Jones Limited after South African retailer Woolworths launched a takeover bid for the department store. Lew was formerly a director then chairman of Coles Myer (now known as the Coles Group) until voted out by shareholders. He was also involved in an attempt to resurrect Ansett airlines with Lindsay Fox following its collapse in September 2001. In 2008 he returned to the board of his public company, Premier Investments, and became its chairman.

In 2016 he became the first Australian to be inducted into the World Retail Hall of Fame, which recognises the lifetime achievements of retail "legends".

In 2021, the Financial Review assessed Lew's net worth as 4.37 billion; Forbes assessed his net worth as 1.46 billion in 2019; and Lew was ranked 33rd on The Australian's Richest 250 List.

Business career

Yannon transaction
While Chairman of Coles Myer, Lew involved Coles Myer in a deal with a private company Yannon Pty Ltd which ultimately lost Coles Myer 18 million. An internal Coles investigation endorsed Lew's claim that he knew nothing of the deal, and a subsequent four-year investigation by the Australian Securities and Investments Commission (ASIC) ended with no charges being pursued.

Alan Cameron, ASIC chairman at the time, acknowledged during the press conference to announce the outcome of the investigation that: "It is worth saying that the original loss suffered by Coles Myer was about 18 million, and the recovery made by Coles Myer was in excess of 12 million." Lew contributed to this 1996 settlement with Coles-Myer. Cameron also said that it was "clearly true" that Lew was not guilty of any breaches of the law. When asked if he believed Lew was innocent, Cameron replied: "of course."

ABC Radio's PM program described the transaction:

When Coles Myer's chief financial officer, Philip Bowman, resigned and revealed the details of the transaction it brought a great deal of unwanted public attention to Lew. Bowman's revelations prompted an investigation into whether the Yannon transaction broke the Corporations Law or other laws that lasted five years and gathered a quarter of a million pages of documents and twelve thousand pages of evidence. The ASIC recommended criminal prosecution against Lew in its brief, although the Commonwealth Director of Public Prosecutions, who had the final decision, decided not to proceed with criminal charges against Lew, Lew's advisers, or those working within Coles Myer. The Chairman of ASIC told the ABC:

The Etiket transaction
Another controversial business transaction involving Lew related to a single purpose trust called Etiket. The beneficiaries were Lew's family. The trust was used to acquire 2% of Coles Myer in 1989, at a time of high interest rates. Lew offered competing explanations for what happened next. But the end result was that the Coles Myer shares were assigned to Premier Investments for an 8 million profit. A Queen's Counsel who investigated the transaction said:

TESNA 
Lew and Lindsay Fox formed a consortium to acquire Ansett Airlines after it had an Administrator appointed. They sought and obtained the exclusive right to negotiate to purchase the airline. They obtained the agreement of various stakeholders in the airline, including trade union members and their representatives. Greg Combet, the secretary of the ACTU said Lew had breached 'repeated commitments'. During this time spent negotiating, the administrators had been persuaded to continue to operate the airline despite heavy losses which reduced the amount ultimately available to creditors, which included employees owed entitlements. Lew and Fox had committed to take on 183 million of these entitlement obligations if they acquired the company. These commitments and their statements that they could and would proceed with the acquisition led the trade unions with members involved in the business to support the bid. The consequence of Lew's withdrawal was much embarrassment for the ACTU, which had strongly supported the Lew-Fox bid.

Coles Myer board
In September 2002, a resolution to remove Lew from the Board of Coles Myer was successful after Stan Wallis, the Chairman of the company, campaigned for Lew's removal. Wallis successfully lobbied major institutional shareholders, including insurance companies, banks and large investment firms to take the rare action of voting against an incumbent director. Prior to the vote, Lew campaigned heavily spending an estimated 10 million campaigning for his re-election focusing mainly on smaller shareholders. He was successful in obtaining millions of proxies but they were ultimately insufficient.

Premier Investments and Just Group
In March 2008, Lew returned to the public company stage, rejoining the board of the listed company Premier Investments, as its chairman. At the same time, Premier announced a takeover offer for Just Group, one of Australia's largest retailers which owns Just Jeans, Portmans, Dotti, Peter Alexander, Jay Jays, Smiggle and Jacqui E. Analysts criticised the offer for being too low and comprising less than half in cash. In publicly explaining his offer, Lew said Just Group was trading worse than had been disclosed to the investment community.

Premier's stationery brand Smiggle was profitable in its first year in the United Kingdom after launching in 2015. The brand was subsequently launched in Hong Kong and Malaysia in 2016. Smiggle's first global flagship store was opened on London's Oxford Street in 2018, along with the first concession outlet in department store Selfridges.

Personal life
Lew is Jewish and is a member of the Chabad House synagogue in Malvern, Victoria. In 2014 Lew separated from Rosie Lew , his wife of forty years. Their three children are active in the Lew's business empire including Peter, who is the chairman of P Lew Investment Group and the owner of the BrandBank Group of Companies. He is married to Ally Lew and has three children; Steven, who married Sarah Nowoweiski in 2003 and filed for divorce in 2011. They have two children; and Jacqueline, who married Adam Priester in 1999 and filed for divorce in 2011. They have four children.

In 1999, each of his children were gifted 170 million from the "Lew Custodian Trust".

Net worth
In May 2021 The Australian Financial Review estimated Lew's net worth as 4.37 billion as published in the Financial Review Rich List; and in January 2019 his net worth was estimated by Forbes Asia  as 1.90 billion as published in the list of Australia's 50 richest people. , Lew was one of ten Australians who have appeared in every Financial Review Rich List, or its predecessor, the BRW Rich 200, since it was first published in 1984.

See also
Brian Quinn

References

External links
Lateline 20 November 2002 – Lew booted from Coles Myer
Lew's fights to stay on Coles Myer Board
Premier Investment's profile

Australian businesspeople in retailing
Businesspeople from Melbourne
Australian Jews
1945 births
Living people
Australian billionaires
People from Brunswick, Victoria